Forest, Wisconsin is the name of some places in the U.S. state of Wisconsin:
Forest County, Wisconsin
Forest, Fond du Lac County, Wisconsin, a town
Forest, Richland County, Wisconsin, a town
Forest, St. Croix County, Wisconsin, a town
Forest, Vernon County, Wisconsin, a town
Forest (community), Wisconsin, an unincorporated community in St. Croix County